The Pemberton Mill was a large factory in Lawrence, Massachusetts. It suddenly collapsed and occupants were crushed or burned alive on January 10, 1860, in what has been called "the worst industrial accident in Massachusetts history" and "one of the worst industrial calamities in American history". An estimated 88 to 145 workers were killed and 166 injured.

Investigators attributed the disaster to substandard construction that was then drastically overloaded with second-floor equipment, all evident and preventable. The event was cited in improvements to industrial construction and workplace safety. The mill was soon rebuilt in place.

Background

Its chief engineer was Charles H. Bigelow. This was called "a fortune for those times".

During a financial panic in 1857, Lowell and Putnam sold the mill to George Howe and David Nevins, Sr. at a $350,000 loss. The new owners jammed more machinery into their factory attempting to boost its profits.

Collapse
Shortly before 5:00 p.m. on a Tuesday afternoon in 1860, workers in nearby factories watched with horror as the Pemberton Mill buckled and then collapsed with a mighty crash.  According to later court testimony reported by The New York Times, owner George Howe escaped as the structure was falling.

Dozens were killed instantly and more than six hundred workers, many of them women and children, were trapped in the twisted ruins.  When the winter sun set, rescuers built bonfires to illuminate their efforts, revealing "faces crushed beyond recognition, open wounds in which the bones showed through a paste of dried blood, brick dust, and shredded clothing".

Around 9:30 p.m., with many people still trapped in the twisted wreck of the factory, someone accidentally knocked over an oil lantern.  Flames raced across the cotton waste and splintered wood — some of it soaked with oil.  One trapped man cut his own throat rather than be consumed by the approaching flames; he was rescued, but died from his other injuries.  As the fire grew, rescuers, physicians, families of the trapped victims, and spectators were all driven back by the conflagration.  The screams coming from the ruins were soon silenced, leaving rescuers to eventually discover only the burned, smoldering remains of  "brick, mortar and human bones ... promiscuously mingled".

American Heritage magazine gives this account:

The Boston Almanac and Business Directory notes:

The Boston Globe describes the carnage more vividly:

Victims
Estimates of the number killed by the collapse and subsequent fire vary from 88 to 145.  Most were recent immigrants, either Irish or Scots,  many of them young women.  

Irish and Scots were the majority, and the casualty list is indicative of New England's labor force at that time.  It includes Yankees from Maine and New Hampshire, and immigrants from Germany and Switzerland.  All the churches of Lawrence — Baptists, Catholic, Congregationalist, Episcopalian, Methodist, Presbyterian, Unitarian, and Universalist — had parishioners to console after the disaster.

Aftermath
The disaster was determined to have been caused by a number of preventable factors. Ignoring already questionable load limits, extra textile machinery had been crowded into the upper floors of the factory. Investigators also discovered substandard construction. The brick walls were improperly mortared and supported. The iron columns supporting the floors were cheap and brittle but had been installed nonetheless.

In the wake of the disaster, area ministers delivered "sermons on God's inscrutable wrath" but it was apparent that blame lay in the manner in which the factory was built and operated. The Scientific American wrote, "...there is now no doubt that the fall of the building was owing to the most gross negligence and want of fidelity in casting the columns." The tragedy became a rallying point to improve safety standards in industrial workplaces. It also inspired the popular sketch "The Tenth of January" by author Elizabeth Stuart Phelps Ward.

David Nevins, Sr. bought out his partner and rebuilt the mill.  After his death it passed to his sons, David Nevins, Jr. and Henry Cotton Nevins.

See also
 2013 Savar building collapse -  The deadliest accidental structural collapse in modern history
Grover Shoe Factory disaster
List of industrial disasters

References

Bibliography

External links
 Tourlawrence - a location-based documentary and interactive history trail about two sisters who worked in the Pemberton Mill in 1860.

Collapsed buildings in the United States
Industrial accidents and incidents in the United States
Disasters in Lawrence, Massachusetts
1860 disasters in the United States
1860 disestablishments in Massachusetts
Buildings and structures in Lawrence, Massachusetts
History of Essex County, Massachusetts
Textile mills in the United States
Buildings and structures demolished in 1860
1853 establishments in Massachusetts
Industrial buildings completed in 1853
January 1860 events